In the seven-layer OSI model of computer networking, the session layer is layer 5.

The session layer provides the mechanism for opening, closing and managing a session between end-user application processes, i.e., a semi-permanent dialogue. Communication sessions consist of requests and responses that occur between applications. Session-layer services are commonly used in application environments that make use of remote procedure calls (RPCs).

An example of a session-layer protocol is the OSI protocol suite session-layer protocol, also known as X.225 or ISO 8327. In case of a connection loss this protocol may try to recover the connection. If a connection is not used for a long period, the session-layer protocol may close it and re-open it. It provides for either full duplex or half-duplex operation and provides synchronization points in the stream of exchanged messages.

Other examples of session layer implementations include Zone Information Protocol (ZIP) – the AppleTalk protocol that coordinates the name binding process, and Session Control Protocol (SCP) – the DECnet Phase IV session-layer protocol.

Within the service layering semantics of the OSI network architecture, the session layer responds to service requests from the presentation layer and issues service requests to the transport layer.

Services
Authentication
Authorization
Session restoration (checkpointing and recovery)

The session layer of the OSI model is responsible for session checkpointing and recovery. It allows information of different streams, perhaps originating from different sources, to be properly combined or synchronized.

An example usage of the session layer is session beans, which are only active as long as the session is active, and are deleted when the session is disconnected.  Java developers can use them to store information about the user during a web session.

An example application is web conferencing, in which the streams of audio and video must be synchronous to avoid so-called lip sync problems. Flow control ensures that the person displayed on screen is the current speaker.

Another application is in live TV programs, where streams of audio and video need to be seamlessly merged and transitioned from one to the other to avoid silent airtime or excessive overlap.

Protocols

ADSP, AppleTalk Data Stream Protocol
ASP, AppleTalk Session Protocol
H.245, Call Control Protocol for Multimedia Communication
ISO-SP, OSI session-layer protocol (X.225, ISO 8327)
iSNS, Internet Storage Name Service
L2F, Layer 2 Forwarding Protocol
L2TP, Layer 2 Tunneling Protocol
NetBIOS, Network Basic Input Output System
PAP, Password Authentication Protocol
PPTP, Point-to-Point Tunneling Protocol
RPC, Remote Procedure Call Protocol
RTCP, Real-time Transport Control Protocol
SMPP, Short Message Peer-to-Peer
SCP, Session Control Protocol
SOCKS, the SOCKS internet protocol
ZIP, Zone Information Protocol
SDP, Sockets Direct Protocol

Comparison with TCP/IP model
The TCP/IP reference model does not concern itself with the OSI model's details of application or transport protocol semantics and therefore does not consider a session layer. OSI's session management in connection with the typical transport protocols (TCP, SCTP), is contained in the transport-layer protocols, or otherwise considered the realm of the application layer protocols. TCP/IP's layers are descriptions of operating scopes (application, host-to-host, network, link) and not detailed prescriptions of operating procedures or data semantics.

See also
 Session (computer science)

References

OSI model